The following is a list of places located within the London Borough of Islington:

Angel
Archway
Barnsbury
Canonbury
Clerkenwell
Farringdon
Finsbury
Finsbury Park
Highbury
Highgate
Holloway
Islington
Kings Cross
Lower Holloway
Mildmay
Nag's Head
Newington Green
Pentonville
St Luke's
Tufnell Park
Upper Holloway

Lists of places in London